Cholapuram is a village in the Orathanadu taluk of Thanjavur district, Tamil Nadu, India.

Demographics 

As per the 2011 census, Cholapuram had a total population of 2285, and the literacy rate was 72.05%.

Work Profile 
72.39 % of the 1,311 working population describe their employment as working more than 6 months while the remaining 27.61 % describe their work as marginal activity providing livelihood for less than 6 months. Of the 72.39 % in hard labour, 168 were cultivators and 658 work in agriculture.

References 

 

Villages in Thanjavur district